Series 4 of La France a un incroyable talent aired from 24 November to 30 December 2009, and saw contestants compete by showcasing their talents before judges. The winner of the series was Les Echo-liés, a dancer.

Background
Auditions for the fourth series started in late 2008 and successful contestants were notified in December 2008. Filming began on 15 January 2009.

The season was presented by Alex Goude and Sandrine Corman, replacing Alessandra Sublet, host of the previous three seasons. The jury consisted of producer Gilbert Rozon, present since the first season, actress and director Valérie Stroh, and comedian and humorist Smaïn.

Semi-final 1

The winner was announced 30 December 2009.

Final

France
2009 French television seasons